The  McGill Martlets represented McGill University in the 2010-11 Canadian Interuniversity Sport women's hockey season. The Martlets attempted to win their third Canadian Interuniversity Sport women's ice hockey championship. Their head coach was Peter Smith and he was assisted by Amey Doyle, Stewart McCarthey and Shauna Denis. 
The Martlets captured the CIS title on Sunday with a 5-2 victory over the St. Francis Xavier X-Women

CIS Exhibition

CWHL exhibition

NCAA Exhibition
October 23: The Harvard women's hockey team took a 2-1 lead into the third period but allowed a goal for a 2-2 tie at Bright Hockey Center. McGill took advantage of a five-on-three situation early in the first period as Cathy Chartrand took a feed from Gillian Ferrari and beat Bellamy for a 1-0 lead. Harvard had several opportunities on the power play in the 17th minute, but could not score on McGill netminder Andrea Wickman. With less than a minute to play in the game, McGill pulled its goaltender. With an extra skater, Ann-Sophie Bettez and Leslie Oles almost scored. In the end, Katia Clement-Hydra converted from close range to tie the score at 2-2. The overtime stanza did not result in a game-winning goal.

Roster

Regular season

News and notes
On September 18, 2010, Gillian Ferrari, a first-year Martlets player scored her first-ever CIS goal. It was on a 4-on-3 power play versus Wilfrid Laurier University.
On October 8, 2010, Leslie Oles, a first-year Martlets player scored once and added a pair of assists as the Martlets skated to a 7-4 win over Concordia Stingers in the season opener. The victory extended McGill's win streak to 82 consecutive games over QUHL opponents.
On February 10, 2011, Melodie Daoust signed a letter of intent to play for the McGill Martlets. She refused offers from numerous Canadian and American universities, including Cornell, Dartmouth and a full scholarship from Boston University.

Schedule

Tournaments

Bison Hockey Holiday Classic
December 31: Charline Labonte required only 13 saves to post her 59th career shutout as McGill defeated the nationally ranked fifth overall Alberta Pandas by a 3-0 mark in the final game of the Bisons Holiday Classic tournament at Max Bell Arena. In the game, the Martlets held a 31-13 edge in shots. Gillian Ferrari was credited with the game-winner on the power-play at 5:49 of the first period. Jasmine Sheehan, a fifth-year defender scored the second goal of the game. Logan Murray, a freshman from Calgary, scored the last goal of the contest.

Postseason

Quebec semis

Quebec finals

CIS finals
McGill went into the six-team national tournament as the No. 1 seed for the fifth straight year after posting a 20-0 record to finish first in the Quebec conference for the sixth consecutive year and the seventh time in school history. Their CIS final opponents, StFX finished with a 29-1 record in league and playoff action and a silver-medal finish, the best result ever by an Atlantic conference team. The five Martlets goals were scored by Ann-Sophie Bettez, Jordanna Peroff, Caroline Hill, Jasmine Sheehan, and Alessandra Lind-Kenny.

Outgoing seniors
The Martlets will lose five fifth-year seniors, including forwards Caroline Hill and Alyssa Cecere, along with defenders Lisa Zane and Jasmine Sheehan.

Awards and honors
Jordanna Peroff, CIS finals Most Valuable Player
2011 CIS Tournament All-Stars
Defence: Cathy Chartrand, McGill 
Forward: Jordanna Peroff, McGill
Forward: Leslie Oles, McGill

References

External links
McGill women’s hockey
 The official site of  McGill athletics & recreation
 The official site of CIS Women's Hockey Championship

See also
 McGill Martlets ice hockey
 2011–12 McGill Martlets women's ice hockey season
 2009–10 McGill Martlets women's hockey season
 2008–09 McGill Martlets women's ice hockey season

McGill
McGill Martlets women's ice hockey
McG